Os Trapalhões was a Brazilian comedy group and a television series of the same name created by Wilton Franco. Its members were Dedé (Dedé Santana), Zacarias (Zacarias Gonçalves), Mussum (Carlinhos Mussum) and their leader Didi Mocó (Renato Aragão). The name Os Trapalhões (which can be translated as The Bumbling Ones) is derived from the Portuguese verb atrapalhar, which means the opposite of helping, to do something the wrong way or to Those that confuse. The name is translated "Tramps" in English DVD subtitles. It originally aired on Rede Tupi from 1974 to 1977 and the show later moved to Rede Globo and remained there from 1977 to 1995.

On March 18, 1990, Zacarias died due to respiratory failure, but the group and the series didn't come to an end until July 29, 1994, when Mussum died due to an unsuccessful heart transplant.

Premise

The series consisted of several different minutes scenes featuring comic adventures and situations of the four protagonists, sometimes with just one of them (mostly Didi), two, three and even with all of them, in which they opposed enemies and even each other (these , played pranks on each other or worked together in order to achieve a common goal. There was also throughout the years of the series, several parodies of comics' superheroes, like Superman (mostly played by Didi because of his leader role), Batman (played mostly by Dedé), Spider-Man, Hulk, The Phantom, etc.

Cast

Main characters
Didi Mocó (Renato Aragão) - The leader of the group who however, in some scenes, was treated by his three friends as the most worthless member. A very clever man from Ceará with a peculiar manner of speaking. He rarely ended the scenes with bad luck or as the loser, in which he "fought" enemies or even his own friends.
Dedé (Dedé Santana) - Interpreted as a "second in command" role. He was the most serious one and acted as the brain of the group. His masculinity was always mocked by Didi.
Mussum (Antônio Carlos Bernardes Gomes) - An Afro-Brazilian man who was ever proud to say that he came from Morro da Mangueira, a slum in Rio de Janeiro. He also had a very peculiar vocabulary. His greatest passion being cachaça (the most common distilled beverage in Brazil), which he nicknamed "mé" (or "mel", Portuguese for honey). He was always the butt of jokes and nicknames because of his skin color, as to be sarcastically called Maizena (Corn Starch) by Didi or then the latter's insinuations and innuendos comparing his skin color to that of a vulture's, at which Mussum would become verbally (sometimes physically) aggressive and answer back with offensive jokes about Didi's own northeastern origins or even his own mother.
Zacarias (Mauro Faccio Gonçalves) - A stocky, little man with child's voice and mannerism — frequently putting on childlike tantrums in face of trouble or even role playing as a kid when the sketch asked for it. He also wore a wig due to baldness. This was exploited in sketches where it would be taken off either by Didi or by any other adversity such as an arrow which, missing his head, stabbed the wig to the wall, for instance.

Supporting characters

Dino Santana - Dedé real life's brother. He played several secondary roles throughout the series and in some Trapalhões films. He died in 2010.
Carlos Kurt - A tall blonde man with a very bad look and huge eyes. He often played a villain, bully or other enemy roles in the series and also in some Trapalhões' films. He died in 2003.
Roberto Guilherme - An obese and bald man with whom Didi always had fun by taking off his wig. Also played a large number of antagonist roles, sometimes along Carlos Kurt. Though he played numerous secondary characters, the most memorable of them was the Sargento Pincel (Sergeant Brush), who led an army in which the Trapalhões acted as privates.
Tião Macalé - A very funny toothless black man that usually ended the scenes saying the word Nojento! (Portuguese for "disgusting"). This quote make him very famous both in the series and in Brazil. He died in 1993.
Ted Boy Marino - A real-life wrestler with a Spanish accent (though being of Italian origin) and haircut similar to He-Man's. He died in 2012.

Comics
A comic book series based on Trapalhões were published in during the 1980s and 1990s by
"Bloch Editores" and Editora Abril  respectively, usually in digest size.

References

External links

 
1977 Brazilian television series debuts
1993 Brazilian television series endings
1970s Brazilian television series
1980s Brazilian television series
1990s Brazilian television series
Brazilian comedy
Brazilian parodists
Brazilian comedy television series
Comedy collectives
Portuguese-language television shows
Rede Globo original programming